ATP-binding cassette sub-family A member 13 also known as ABCA13 is a protein that in humans is encoded by the ABCA13 gene on chromosome 7. It belongs to the wide ATP-binding cassette family of proteins. The protein contains 5058 residues, and is currently the largest known protein of the ABC family.

Clinical significance 

One study suggests that rare variations and mutations of the gene may be linked to psychiatric disorders such as schizophrenia, bipolar disorder, and depression.

References

Further reading

External links 
 
 

ATP-binding cassette transporters